The Bramble-class gunboat was a class of four gunboats mounting six 4-inch guns, built for the Royal Navy in 1886. In 1887 the first three were reclassified as gunvessels.

Design

The Bramble class was designed by William White. The ships were of composite construction, meaning that the iron keel, frames, stem and stern posts were of iron, while the hull was planked with timber. This had the advantage of allowing the vessels to be coppered, thus keeping marine growth under control, a problem that caused iron-hulled ships to be frequently docked.

Propulsion

Armament
Ships of the class were armed with six 4-inch 25-pounder quick-firing guns. Four machine guns were also fitted.

Ships

References

Gunboat classes
 
 Bramble (1886)
1886 ships